George Brown (27 April 1783 – 25 June 1857) was an English professional cricketer who played first-class cricket from 1819 to 1838.

A right-handed batsman and fast underarm bowler who played for Hampshire and Sussex, he made 51 known appearances in first-class matches. He represented the Players in the Gentlemen v Players series.

Brown was credited with 89 wickets in his career (i.e., bowled only) with a best return of six in one innings.  He had a reputation for extreme pace and was widely known as "Brown of Brighton".  He is said, though the story may be apocryphal, to have once killed a dog when a ball he had bowled went past the stumps and through a coat held by the longstop, hitting the dog which was behind the coat.  Another of his longstops, a man called Dench, insisted on fielding with a sack of straw tied to his chest for protection. E H Budd played against both Brown and Walter Marcon, who had a similar reputation, and Budd said that "Brown was not more terrific in his speed than Marcon", an elaborate way of saying that they were both extremely fast. Brown was a useful batsman and made 1053 runs at 11.44 with a top score of 70 which he scored during the first of the three roundarm trial matches. He died in Winchester, Hampshire.

References

1783 births
1857 deaths
English cricketers
English cricketers of 1787 to 1825
English cricketers of 1826 to 1863
Players cricketers
Hampshire cricketers
Sussex cricketers
Cricketers from Oxford
Left-Handed v Right-Handed cricketers
The Bs cricketers
Non-international England cricketers